The Tennessee Southern Railroad  began operations in 1988 and currently operates in middle Tennessee and northwestern Alabama. TSRR is owned by Patriot Rail Corporation. Commodities the TSRR handles include scrap iron, coal, coke, woodpulp, pulpboard, sand, chemicals, steel, aluminum, and fertilizer raw materials. 
In 2007, in response to increasing traffic, the TSRR purchased eight diesel locomotives with greater power and fuel efficiency than its existing fleet of ten.

References

External links

Alabama railroads
Tennessee railroads
Spin-offs of CSX Transportation
Patriot Rail Company